The Federal Coalition is a coalition of twenty eight major regional based Nepalese political parties that are demanding the identity based autonomy states in Nepal and the equal representation in Nepalese parliament. Nepalese communities mainly Madhesi, Rai people, Limbu, Magar, Tamang, Gurung, Tharu people and many Janjati Adivasi(indigenous peoples) are fighting every day for rights and autonomy but they are historically underrepresented by ruling elites Bahun (Hill Brahmins) and Chhetris till date.

References

Political organisations based in Nepal
The alliance has now announced a programme that is said to be launching decisive protests so to say to bring about changes in the Nepal Constitution in September; where as the majoritarian forces are hoping to continue with the status quo prevailing at present. After members of the Federal Coalition called off the blockade on the India Nepal border in February this year there has been an attempt to shift the agitation to Kathmandu but that does not seem to have worked so far.